The Namibia national football team represents Namibia in men's international football and is controlled by the Namibia Football Association. They have never qualified for the FIFA World Cup but have made three appearances in the Africa Cup of Nations. The team represents both FIFA and Confederation of African Football (CAF).

History
Namibia played its first international under the name South-West Africa on 16 May 1989 at home against neighbouring Angola and lost 1–0. On 23 March 1990, only two days after gaining independence from South Africa, they hosted neighbour Zimbabwe and lost 5–1. On 7 June, they lost a home friendly 2–1 to Mauritius. Namibia's next contests were played in Lesotho, where they lost 2–0 to their hosts on 1 August 1992, but gained their first ever draw in a 2–2 tie against the same opposition the very next day. Namibia's first win came on 1 July 1994 in a 1–0 victory away over Botswana in a friendly. On 17 May 1998, Namibia played their first match outside of Africa and against non-African opposition, losing 2–1 in a friendly in France against Saudi Arabia.

Namibia has made three appearances in the African Cup of Nations, going out in the first round in all three competitions. In 1998, Namibia lost to Ivory Coast 4–3 and drew Angola 3–3 before losing to South Africa 4–1. In 2008, Namibia lost to Morocco 5–1 and to Ghana 1–0 but drew Guinea 1–1 in their last match. In 2019, they lost all their group games scoring only a single goal. They lost to Morocco 1–0, and suffered the same loss to South Africa before losing to Ivory Coast 4–1.

The most capped player of the Brave Warriors is retired midfielder Ronald Ketjijere with 74 caps while Rudolf Bester is the all-time top goalscorers with 13 goals.

Results and fixtures

The following is a list of match results in the last 12 months, as well as any future matches that have been scheduled.

2021

2022

2023

Coaching history
Caretaker managers are listed in italics.

 Eric Muinjo (1992–1993)
 Shepherd Murape (1994–1995)
 Ruston Mogane (1997–1998)
 Mlungisi Ngubane (1998)
 Seth Boois (1998–1999)
 Heinz-Peter Überjahn (1999)
 Herman Katjiuongua (2000)
 Lucky Richter (2000)
 Ted Dumitru (2000–2003)
 Shepherd Murape (2004)
 Ben Bamfuchile (2006–2007)
 Arie Schans (2007–2008)
 Tom Saintfiet (2008–2010)
 Brian Isaacs (2010–2011)
 Bernard Kaanjuka (2011–2013)
 Roger Palmgren (2013)
 Ricardo Mannetti (2013–2015)
 Fillemon Kanalelo (2015)
 Ricardo Mannetti (2015–2019)
 Bobby Samaria (2019–2021)
 Collin Benjamin (2022-present)

Players

Current squad
The following players were called up to the preliminary squad for the 2023 AFCON qualification matches against Cameroon on 24 and 28 March 2023.

Caps and goals correct as of 17 July 2022, after the match against Zambia.

Recent call-ups
The following players have been called up for Namibia in the last 12 months.

DEC Player refused to join the team after the call-up.
INJ Player withdrew from the squad due to an injury.
PRE Preliminary squad.
RET Player has retired from international football.
SUS Suspended from the national team.

Previous squads
Africa Cup of Nations Squads
1998 Africa Cup of Nations squad
2008 Africa Cup of Nations squad
2019 Africa Cup of Nations squad

Player records

Players in bold are still active with Namibia.

Competitive record

FIFA World Cup record

Africa Cup of Nations record

African Nations Championship record

COSAFA Cup

Head-to-head record against other nations
Updated on 17 November 2019 after match against

Honours
COSAFA Cup
Winners: 2015
Runners-up: 1997, 1999, 2022

References
https://footballfashion.org/wordpress/2021/09/01/namibia-2021-22-umbro-home-away-and-third-kits/

External links

Namibia at FIFA.com
Namibia Football Association official website

 
African national association football teams